SF Filmstaden Bergakungen is a cineplex located in Gothenburg, Sweden. Bergakungen has 14 cinemas with a total capacity of 2,260 visitors. The cinema has two of Sweden's largest projection screens, measuring  each.

Bergakungen also has a VIP cinema section with an adjacent lounge with and a bar. The VIP section has more comfortable seats.

References

External links 
 

Buildings and structures in Gothenburg
Cinemas in Sweden